Acacia dorothea, commonly known as Dorothy's wattle, is a shrub or small tree which is native to New South Wales.

See also
List of Acacia species

References

dorothea
Fabales of Australia
Plants described in 1901